Mohammad Deh (also Romanized as Moḩammad Deh; also known as Mamdeh and Mamiye) is a village in Khandan Rural District, Tarom Sofla District, Qazvin County, Qazvin Province, Iran. At the 2006 census, its population was 313, in 50 families.

References 

Populated places in Qazvin County